Candlelight Red is a rock band from Williamsport, Pennsylvania. They released two studio albums and an EP in the early 2010s. Their EP Demons and album Reclamation were produced by Morgan Rose of Sevendust. The band took a break from touring in 2013, but when they began planning dates in 2014, vocalist Ryan Hoke announced he was leaving the band for a job opportunity "he felt he just could not pass up". CLR reunited in 2016 and performed several shows between May and December. The band has remained inactive since. Guitarist Jeremy Edge released a solo album in October 2020. The band including Lead Singer Ryan Hoke got back together and released a new 4 Song EP The Flood in January 2022.

Discography

Studio albums
The Wreckage (2011)
Reclamation (2013)

Extended plays
 Demons (2012)
 The Flood (2022)

Singles

References

Hard rock musical groups from Pennsylvania
Musical groups established in 2011
2011 establishments in Pennsylvania